Mary Parker Woodworth (Parker; May 3, 1849 – June 14, 1919) was an American writer and speaker on educational and missionary topics. She was the first New Hampshire graduate from Vassar College, and the first woman member of the Concord, New Hampshire Board of Education.

Early life and education

Mary Parker was born at Sugar Hill, New Hampshire, May 3, 1849. She was the daughter of Charles and Amelia (Bennett) Parker. Woodworth's brother, Col. H. E. Parker, became editor of the Bradford Opinion.

Woodworth was educated at St. Johnsbury Academy, being the only girl in a graduating class of nine. She entered Vassar College in the sophomore year and graduating with first honor in 1870, the first New Hampshire graduate.

Career
On September 30, 1873, she married Albert Woodworth, afterward mayor of Concord. Their children were Edward, Grace, and Charles.

Woodworth taught at St. Johnsbury Academy and St. Agnes Hall, Bellows Falls, Vermont. She did much literary work. She was also a patron of art and music, being instrumental in the organization of the Concord Choral Union, of which she was vice-president.

Woodworth was the first woman member of the Concord board of education, serving nine years, 1890–9, and declining a re-election. She served as president, Concord Woman's Club, 1897–9; chair, Scholarship Fund, New Hampshire Federation of Women's Clubs, designed to aid in the normal training of girls for teaching in rural schools, since its establishment in 1904. She was a member of the Vassar and Collegiate Alumnae Associations, and twice president of the Boston branch. In religion, Woodworth was an Episcopalian, communicant of St. Paul's Church, Concord. She served as president of New Hampshire Diocesan Woman's Auxiliary to the General Board of Missions from 1912.

She was a writer and speaker in behalf of causes which interested her.

Death and legacy
She died in Concord, June 14, 1919. Her letters are held in a collection at the Vassar College Digital Library.

Notes

References

Attribution
 
 
 

1849 births
1919 deaths
People from Sugar Hill, New Hampshire
Writers from New Hampshire
Lecturers
St. Johnsbury Academy alumni
Vassar College alumni
Clubwomen
School board members in New Hampshire